Marion, and surrounding Grant County, Indiana have erected a series of statues around the area depicting the comic strip character Garfield. The brainchild of local leader Pete Beck (a county councilman at the time), the basic idea is to place a likeness of Garfield in each community in the county. It is hoped that as the project matures Garfield fans will travel to Grant County and make a circuit to see all of the statues. The statues are made of hollow fiberglass after private fundraising provides for the construction at each location. Indiana native and creator of Garfield, Jim Davis has donated the artwork to create the statues royalty free.

Locations
First Fairmount, "James Dean Garfield" was unveiled in July 2006. He is dressed in "cool" attire, sporting an open-button collar and denim jeans, placed outside the Fairmount Historical Museum. In tribute to Van Buren, dubbed "the Popcorn Capital of the World", "Popcorn Eating Garfield" was unveiled during the August, 2006 Popcorn Festival. Garfield is dressed in the athletic uniform of the now-defunct Van Buren High School "Aces." In Sweetser, "College-bound Garfield" was unveiled in October 2006; the statue is located along the popular Sweetser Switch Trail after money was raised by the Sweetser Lions Club. This one is in place in front of the train. The statue was vandalized when its lower left arm was cut off, but was repaired by summer 2007.

Marion's first statue, "Health and Fitness Garfield" is dressed in running attire sporting the colors of Marion High School and carries a water bottle. It was placed downtown along the Mississinewa River, at the start of the popular River Walk leading to Matter Park, in July 2006. This one was damaged when a man hugged Garfield too tightly and the head came off. The head was discovered at the Mississinewa Reservoir, and eventually restored to its body. City officials rededicated the repaired statue during Oktoberfest celebrations in 2009. It is now located at Matters Park. Marion's second statue is Marion General Hospital's "Doctor Garfield" unveiled on May 11, 2007. He is wearing surgical scrubs, holding a stethoscope and resting one foot on a first aid kit. Hospital staff members raised the money for this statue.

The town of Swayzee erected a Garfield statue in June, 2008. "Speedkings Garfield" is dressed ready to hit the courts with the former Swayze High School basketball team. His jersey number 9 represents the number of overtime periods played in the record setting basketball game against Liberty Center in 1964. Garfield stands on Washington Street, near Alumni Park and Swayze Elementary School. The town of Matthews set up "Fisherman Garfield", paying homage to the local river and bridges. The town's statue is placed near the Cumberland Covered Bridge. Plans were to place the statue in August, 2008 and it is now installed (summer 2009).

Fundraising in the town of Jonesboro has produced "Firefighter Garfield", commemorating that Joneboro was the home of the first organized fire department in the county. Town officials hoped to place this statue in Fall, 2009 at 6 W Sixth Street, in front of the fire department. The town of Upland is erecting "Ice Cream Lover Garfield", to be placed near Ivanhoe's Restaurant, 979 S Main Street. The statue, delayed by production problems, has been built and was displayed in the 2009 63rd annual Labor Day parade. It was planned for installation in September, 2009.

Gas City installed "Gas Worker Garfield" complete with a replica of a gas derrick, reminiscent of the natural gas boom at the turn of the 19th Century which made the city . After being in its temporary location inside the Gas City library for more than a year in May 2011 the statue was placed on its permanent mounting in front of the library, at the corner of First and Main Streets. Outside Payne's, a local restaurant in Gas City that serves British cuisine, there is statue of Garfield dressed up as a British redcoat.

Muncie, Indiana has several Garfield statues throughout the city, including many on and around the campus of Ball State University. Davis lived in Muncie and graduated from Ball State.

Although not an official part of the project, in a similar vein Arbor Trace Golf Club commissioned a local chainsaw artist to carve a wooden Garfield statue which has been placed in the clubhouse. "Golfer Garfield" is dressed as a duffer leaning on his driver.

References

External links
 Map of the Garfield statues trail
 Web site of the Marion-Grant County Convention & Visitors Bureau
 Official web site of county government
 Official Garfield website

Garfield
Buildings and structures in Grant County, Indiana
Tourist attractions in Grant County, Indiana
Outdoor sculptures in Indiana
Fiberglass sculptures
2006 sculptures
Statues of fictional characters
Cats in art
Vandalized works of art in Indiana